Şahbəyli (also, Şahboyli, Shakhbeyli, Shebali, and Shebaly) is a village and municipality in the Agsu Rayon of Azerbaijan.  It has a population of 291.

References 

Populated places in Agsu District